Starr is a given name which may refer to:

People
 Starr Andreeff, Canadian actress
 Starr Andrews (born 2001), American figure skater
 Starr Faithfull (1906-1931), American socialite
 Starr Roxanne Hiltz, American retired computer scientist
 Starr Kempf (1917–1995), American sculptor
 Starr Long (born 1970), American game developer
 Starr Parodi, American composer
 Starr Walton (born 1942), American alpine skier

Fictional characters
 Starr the Slayer, a Marvel Comics hero
 Starr Carter, protagonist of The Hate U Give
 Starr Manning, on the soap opera One Life to Live

See also
Star (name), given name and surname

North American given names